is a Japanese manga series written and illustrated by Tetsurō Kasahara, with writing contributions by Makoto Tezuka and Masami Yuki. It was serialized in Hero's Inc.'s Monthly Hero's magazine from December 2014 to December 2020 and transferred to Comiplex online website in November 2020. Its chapters have been collected in 17 tankōbon volumes as of May 2022. An anime television series adaptation aired from April to July 2017.

The manga is based on Osamu Tezuka's Astro Boy series and is initially set up as a prequel, depicting the events up until the birth of Astro Boy. However, as the story progresses, discrepancies with the main story of Astro Boy emerge, and it is later revealed to be a different world with a divergent history from that of Astro Boy after an incident in 1969.

Plot
It is five years after a catastrophe of unknown cause occurred in Japan. The young genius duo from Nerima University, Umatarō Tenma and Hiroshi Ochanomizu, work together to develop a new type of artificial intelligence called Bewußtsein, which has an "ego" or "mind". Equipped with it, they create an autonomous robot named A106 ("Atom" in Japanese wordplay), which has a will and a personality. However, their Laboratory 7 is chronically short of funds. In addition, it is difficult for the faculty to understand them. To earn funds, they participate in a Robot Wrestling tournament for the prize money. They win by exploiting the weaknesses of their opponents, and in the end, they shut down the previous champion, Mars, to win the tournament, and become the center of attention.

However, things take an unexpected turn when they try to find out more about Dr. Lolo, the developer of Mars, out of curiosity. As a result, both Umatarō and Hiroshi end up being targeted by a mysterious organization, as they get involved in the secrets of the underworld, the murkiness of the government, and the darkness of the catastrophe five years ago, but this does not damper their spirits. At the request of the Ministry of Science and the university's upper management, they are asked to participate in the World Robot Battling (WRB) event in Australia with the successor to A106, A107 (Yuran). However, as Yuran's enthusiasm for the competition spread, the other robots began to run amok. In the end, the WRB is cancelled, and when they return to Japan, Hiroshi's grandfather, who had been out of town, appeared before them. What he told them was an unbelievable story about a "boy-shaped robot from the future" (which Hiroshi had heard of before). Based on the information his grandfather had given him, Umatarō and Hiroshi headed for Ho Chi Minh City in Vietnam. There, they incompletely solve the mystery of the boy-shaped robot in question.

Characters

A 19-year-old graduate student doing robotics research at Laboratory 7, Department of Robotics, Nerima University, who skipped five years of school, earning his undergraduate credits within a year of entering the university and moving on to the master's program. In terms of age, he is of the same generation as the university's freshmen. He is also working on a new type of AI, the Bewußtsein, and is also involved in the development of onboard equipment and power units for robots, with the one currently under development capable of 100,000 horsepower.

A 26-year-old graduate student who works with Umatarō on robotics research at Laboratory 7 of the Department of Robotics at Nerima University. He is righteous, gentle, and good-natured. Because of his face, which is also called "little koala" by Umatarō, he is not popular with women, but he doesn't seem to mind as he has little desire of that kind. He is tall and thin at first glance, but he is reasonably strong, likely because he used to organize the scrap material around the laboratory.
A106

Also known as Six. He is the sixth model of the autonomous "A10 Series" robots equipped with Bewußtsein, currently under development in Laboratory 7. His catchphrase in Robot Wrestling is "kindhearted science boy." He was originally conceived by Umatarō as an "ultimate superhuman with seven powers," but Hiroshi decided to change it. He is equipped with Boost Cylinders in his lower arms and legs, which are operated by high-pressure gas, and uses Boost Jumps to enhance his jumping power, a fist attack called the Impact Attack, and a High Speed Beat Punch that is operated continuously.

A 20-year-old second-year student at Nerima University's Department of Robotics who specializes in system-related fields such as programming. She is the younger sister of Moriya Tsutsumi. She is the daughter of a wealthy man, and is a beautiful, stylish, and talented young woman.

Hiroshi's half-sister, a 16-year-old girl with glasses who hangs out in her brothers' lab. Her hobby is disassembling machines, often scavenging for parts from the scrap yard in Lab 7. She is a member of her high school's robotics club.
A107
Also known as Yuran. The successor to Six, this autonomous robot was created to complete the A10 series. She has three times the power of Six, a U-shaped muon sensor, and the ability to fly with her microjet system. On the other hand, her batteries are severely depleted, and she is equipped with two spare Sphere Tank batteries.

The president of Maruhige Shipping, an anything-goes store where Umatarō and Hiroshi go to work part-time to earn money. He is an old-fashioned type and does not trust robots or computers.

High school student and son of Kensaku. Unlike his father, he loves robots and is a fan of Robot Wrestling. He falls in love with Ran at first sight when they first meet. He calls himself a detective and is inquisitive. He also uses the family tradition of jujutsu for self-defense.

A top research student in lab 1 of the Department of Robotics at Nerima University. Like Umatarō, he lost his parents in a major disaster five years ago. He himself is debilitated from the injuries he sustained during the disaster, and uses a robotic chair that he designed himself.

A beautiful woman whose identity is unknown except that she is the development designer and owner of Mars. Her true identity is a disguised Moriya Tsutsumi. The only people who know about this are Bremner, who is an acquaintance, and Hiroshi, who learned about it during the WRB commotion, as well as robots such as A106 who are not fooled by the disguise. Motoko notices that she looks a lot like him, but she doesn't think that her brother is dressed as a woman, so she and Umatarō make a wild guess that she is their parents' illegitimate child.

190 centimeters tall, 120 kilograms in weight, and with 1800 horsepower, this robot was developed as a test bed for military weapons, and is a two-time champion of the robot martial arts event Robot Wrestling. Its catchphrase is "invincible god of war." In addition to an excellent AI comparable to that of the A106, it is equipped with the Knife Hand Strike, a slashing attack that uses super vibration, the Jeter Shield, wings that enables it to fly, and a body made of Zeronium, a new alloy that is still under development, so that even A106's sensors cannot see through Mars's body.

Professor of the Department of Robotics at Nerima University. He is an authority on the development of electronic brains, and although he is eccentric, he has overwhelming authority within the university. According to Hiroshi's grandfather, the ultimate goal of his research is to use robotic technology to immortalize humans, which is why he turned his daughter into a cyborg. In WRB, he comes to Australia as a chaperone for all the members of Lab 7, but disappears amidst the runaway commotion.

First mentioned in conversations between Hiroshi and Kensaku, he makes his full-scale appearance in chapter 35 of volume 7 of the manga. His real name is unknown. The nickname given to him by Umatarō is "Ochagran." According to him, when Japan was poor after the Pacific War, his parents were forced to work hard and died early because of it, so he decided to create a robot that could work with people. However, he said it should not be a slave that works in place of people, nor should it take work away from people, but a robot with a heart that can work with people, live with them, and share their joy. In order to achieve this goal, he invented many things and developed a number of programming languages, including "N-eva18," which laid the foundation for subsequent robot technology. However, his research was interrupted in 1969 when he encountered a "boy-shaped robot from the future," and he has since been wandering the world looking for the robot that disappeared.

The daughter of Professor Saruta and member of the special investigations division of ICE, the International Crime Enquiry organization. She lost her mother in an accident 18 years ago, and also lost her right eye and part of her brain, but her father gave her the ability to see beyond normal human vision and access electronic devices directly.

Daughter of Tsukie and granddaughter of Professor Saruta. When Tsukie is away for long periods of time on business, she is left in the care of her grandfather, Hikozō. She was brought in by Professor Saruta, who appeared at WRB as a chaperone for Lab 7. She is still in elementary school, but she seems to be conscious of Umatarō.

A robot that performs demonstrations for guests at the theme park Mecha City. Her upper body is human-like, but from the waist down, she looks like a spider with six legs (four legs in the anime). In the anime, the parent company of Mecha City also sponsors the Robot Wrestling, so the Robot Wrestling participants attend events in the city, and Maria also serves as the host of Robot Wrestling.

Media

Manga
Kasahara's Atom: The Beginning began serialization in the  magazine published by Hero's Inc. on December 1, 2014. Makoto Tezuka and Masami Yuki are responsible for the manga series' editorial supervision and concept design, respectively, with Tezuka Productions collaborating. The magazine ceased publication on October 30, 2020, and the series was transferred to Comiplex website, starting publication on November 27, 2020.  has collected its chapters into individual tankōbon volumes. The first volume was released on June 5, 2015. As of May 27, 2022, seventeen volumes have been released.

The manga is licensed in English by Titan Publishing Group, in partnership with StoneBot Comics. The first volume was released, under their Titan Manga imprint, on October 11, 2022.

Volume list

Anime
An anime television series adaptation was announced in June 2016. The anime series is directed by Katsuyuki Motohiro and Tatsuo Satō, with series composition by Junichi Fujisaku and animation produced by OLM, Inc., Production I.G and Signal.MD. Takahiro Yoshimatsu designed the characters and Noriyuki Asakura composed the series' soundtrack. Shinobu Tsuneki, Yoshihiro Ishimoto and Shinichi Miyazaki are responsible for mechanical design. The 12-episode series aired from April 15 to July 8, 2017, on NHK G. It was streamed by Amazon on their Amazon Prime Video service. Sentai Filmworks has licensed the series for home video and exclusively streamed the series on Amazon's Anime Strike streaming service. The opening theme song, titled , is performed by After the Rain, while the ending theme song, titled , is performed by Yoshino Nanjō.

Episode list

See also
Rideback, a manga series illustrated by Tetsuro Kasahara

References
Notes

References

External links
  
  
  
 

2017 anime television series debuts
Astro Boy
Anime series based on manga
Anime Strike
Manga adapted into television series
NHK original programming
OLM, Inc.
Production I.G
Science fiction anime and manga
Seinen manga
Sentai Filmworks
Shogakukan manga
Signal.MD
Titan Books titles